Gillian Taylforth (born 14 August 1955) is an English actress. She is best known for her role as Kathy Beale on the BBC soap opera EastEnders, and has also appeared as Jackie Pascoe/Webb on ITV's Footballers' Wives (2002–2006), and as Sgt. Nikki Wright in ITV's The Bill (2006–2008). She has also appeared in film during her early career, has presented on ITV's Loose Women and appeared as a celebrity contestant on Strictly Come Dancing in 2008.

In January 2013, she was a contestant in Celebrity Big Brother. From May 2013 she played Sandy Roscoe on Channel 4 soap opera Hollyoaks, but left in Summer 2014, and returned in December to again leave with Joe Roscoe in January 2015. Despite her EastEnders character being presumed dead after being killed off-screen in 2006, Taylforth made a shock return to the show in February 2015 as part of the 30th anniversary episode. The BBC later confirmed that she would reprise the role of Kathy permanently later in the year and she appeared again regularly from August 2015.

Early life and career
Taylforth attended William Tyndale Junior School, Barnsbury Secondary School for Girls, Kingsway College of Further Education and the Anna Scher Theatre School in London. She started her acting career in the 1970s and before securing her big break she worked as a secretary between minor roles. Early television appearances include roles in the BBC comedy Hi-de-Hi!, Shelley, Play for Today, On Safari, Minder, Sink or Swim and The Rag Trade. She played the role of Sherry in the 1980 gangster film The Long Good Friday.

EastEnders
On 19 February 1985, Taylforth appeared as Kathy Beale in the first episode of the BBC's new soap opera EastEnders. This role earned her huge popularity and public recognition on British television. Taylforth was in the show until 1998, when she opted to leave. During her time on the show, Taylforth’s character covered an array of serious issues including rape, domestic violence, teenage pregnancy, divorce, alcoholism and meningitis. 

Kathy is one of the longest running characters to feature in the soap. She made a brief return in 1999 for the storyline to aid the departure of her brother-in-law Grant, played by actor Ross Kemp. Kathy left Albert Square again on 6 January 2000.

In 2005, press rumours suggested that Taylforth was returning to the show. However, this did not occur and the character of Kathy died off-screen in February 2006 in a car crash in South Africa. Taylforth later commented: "I was a bit upset at first because it was 13 years of my life and I didn't like the thought of being killed off. I thought she might come back to see Ian (her on-screen son) and have some illness. But that's the way it goes." 

In 2013, Taylforth said it was a mistake to 'kill off' her character and expressed an interest in coming ‘back from the dead’. She also revealed that former producers had wanted Kathy back in EastEnders. At the time, an EastEnders spokesman said that producers had no plans to bring back Kathy Beale. However on 14 November 2014, Taylforth reprised the role of Kathy for a Children In Need special in which Ian knocks his head and sees visions of the deceased women in his life.

On 19 February 2015, Taylforth made a surprise appearance as Kathy Beale in a live segment of the 30th anniversary episode. It was revealed that she had not died but instead faked her own death in South Africa in 2006. The BBC then confirmed Taylforth would be reprising the role of Kathy permanently. Kathy then made another guest appearance in May before returning in August on a regular basis. The BBC revealed the screen age of the character Kathy Beale, as 70 years old, in a 2020 Eastenders episode.

Other work and roles
After leaving EastEnders in 1998, Taylforth was cast as Jackie Pascoe-Webb in ITV's television drama, Footballers' Wives. In a Channel 4 poll for the 100 Greatest Sexy Moments, a time where she ends up having sex on top of a snooker table with Cristian Solimeno was placed at number 49. She played the role for all five series, which made her the only cast member to appear in every series without taking a break. (Zöe Lucker also appeared in all five series, but left midway through the 4th series before returning towards the end of the final one.) She also appeared on Lily Savage's Blankety Blank in 2001.

In 2006, she played the role of Mandy Searle in the comedy/drama Jane Hall and she also has appeared as a recurring panellist on ITV's topical chat-show Loose Women (2000, 2006 and 2008). She had a regular part in ITV's police drama The Bill playing Sergeant Nikki Wright, and made her first screen appearance on 8 November 2006. Taylforth left the role in 2008. In 2010, Taylforth took over in the theatre tour of Mum's The Word from Bernie Nolan after she left when her cancer was diagnosed for a second time. The tour also starred Coronation Street actresses Tracy Shaw and Sally Ann Matthews and was directed by Taylforth's EastEnders colleague Andrew Lynford. She also made several pantomime appearances around this time. 

In January 2013, she became a housemate on the eleventh series of Celebrity Big Brother. She was the fourth person to be evicted from the house after fifteen days.

In February 2013, it was announced that she had joined the cast of British soap opera, Hollyoaks, as matriarch of the Roscoe family, Sandy Roscoe. After just over a year in the role, Taylforth announced her decision to leave the role of Sandy to spend more time with her family. She departed on-screen on 22 August 2014. Taylforth briefly reprised the role of Sandy in December 2014, but she departed again shortly afterwards.

Strictly Come Dancing
Taylforth was partnered with Anton Du Beke in the sixth series of Strictly Come Dancing in 2008, but was voted off in Week 2 after a dance-off with Jodie Kidd. It later emerged that Taylforth had suffered torn knee ligaments whilst in training for the live shows, but chose to dance regardless.

Personal life
Taylforth is the sister of actress Kim Taylforth. During her time in EastEnders, she dated her fellow castmate Nick Berry, who played Simon Wicks. She began a relationship with Geoff Knights in the late 1980s. The couple lived in Broxbourne, Hertfordshire and later in Arrington, Cambridgeshire. She gave birth to their daughter in 1992. In 1996 she suffered a miscarriage, and less than a year later doctors told her that the baby she was carrying had severe abnormalities and she was advised to terminate the pregnancy." In 1999, she became a mother for a second time.

Knights and Taylforth had an extensive tabloid media history. In January 1994, Taylforth was involved in a high-profile court case when she sued The Sun newspaper for libel after they ran a story claiming she and Knights had performed sexual acts on a slip road on the A1 in their Range Rover. Taylforth claimed that her partner had suffered an acute attack of pancreatitis and she was merely massaging his stomach to soothe his abdominal pain; however, a police officer claimed that she was performing fellatio instead. During the court case, The Sun'''s defence counsel, George Carman QC, entered into evidence a 35-minute home video of Taylforth "suggestively posing with a large sausage [...] graphically simulating masturbation with a wine bottle" and boasting to the camera, "I give very good head". The jury returned a 10-2 majority verdict in favour of The Sun, after which Taylforth collapsed and was taken away by an ambulance.

In 1995, Taylforth wrote an autobiography entitled Kathy and Me'' in which she describes her childhood, her teenage years, her first forays into acting and her lifestyle.

TV and filmography

Theatre Credits

Awards and nominations

References

External links
 
 
Gillian Taylforth biography at biogs.com

1955 births
Living people
English television actresses
English soap opera actresses
Actresses from London
People from Islington (district)
Alumni of the Anna Scher Theatre School
Actresses from Hertfordshire
People from Broxbourne
20th-century English actresses
21st-century English actresses